Clementine Bern-Zernik (1905–1996; née Bloch) was an Austrian lawyer and librarian.

She was born in 1905 in Vienna, Austria, to Max and Olga Bloch. Her father possessed a Juris Doctor, and Bloch decided to follow in his footsteps upon graduating from a humanistic girls’ high school. She obtained her Juris Doctor in 1930 and began a seven-year training requirement at a juvenile court in order to become an attorney. It was during her training that Bloch discovered an interest in criminal law, and she thereby became a prosecutor. Her time as a lawyer was short-lived, however, as she was forbidden to practice law due to her Jewish ancestry beginning on July 15, 1938.

It was also in 1938 that she married architect Oskar Bern. They subsequently immigrated to New York City where Bern-Zernik found a translating job for a newspaper. In 1941, Bern-Zernik later earned her M.A. in Latin and German from the Teachers College, Columbia University. However, due to being Jewish and not being an American citizen, she found few prospects as an educator. From 1944-1946, Bern-Zernik became a naturalized citizen and began working various jobs with the Office of War Information, American Broadcasting Service in Europe, and as a director for a Displaced Person Camp in Germany. By 1948, she returned to New York and served as a librarian at the United Nations. During her time a librarian, she was a liaison between the United Nations and New York Public Library. It was also during the same year that she married her second husband Herbert Zernik. In 1954, she earned an M.A. in library science at Columbia University. Throughout her life, Bern-Zernik was an advocate for Austrian causes, and she even earned a Golden Medallion for her contributions to Austria.

Bern-Zernik passed away on December 31, 1996 in Queens, New York.

See also 

 New York Public Library

References

1905 births
1996 deaths
Austrian women lawyers
Teachers College, Columbia University alumni
American librarians
American women librarians
New York Public Library people
Austrian emigrants to the United States
People with acquired American citizenship
People of the United States Office of War Information
20th-century women lawyers
20th-century American women